Mewis is a surname. Notable people with the name include:

Joseph Mewis (born 1931), Belgian Olympic wrestler
Kristie Mewis (born 1991), American association football player
Sam Mewis (born 1992), American association football player, World Cup Champion and Olympian

See also
Mewes, surname